The 1908 Worcester by-election was held on 7 February 1908.  The by-election was held due to the void election of the incumbent Conservative MP, George Henry Williamson.  It was won by the Conservative candidate Edward Goulding.

After Williamson was elected an election petition was lodged, and Williamson's election was declared void on 25 May 1906. The writ of election was suspended and a Royal Commission was established.  Their report was published in December, concluding that there had been extensive corruption.  New writs were proposed unsuccessfully on 17 December 1906 and 14 February 1907, and the writ was not finally moved until 31 January 1908, leaving the seat without an MP for two years.

References

1908 elections in the United Kingdom
1908 in England
20th century in Worcestershire
Politics of Worcester, England
By-elections to the Parliament of the United Kingdom in Worcestershire constituencies